The 1953 Paris–Nice was the 11th edition of the Paris–Nice cycle race and was held from 12 March to 15 March 1953. The race started in Paris and finished in Nice. The race was won by Jean-Pierre Munch.

General classification

References

1953
1953 in road cycling
1953 in French sport
March 1953 sports events in Europe